Higher Ground is a 501(c)3 non-profit based in Royal Oak, Michigan providing a support group for people living with HIV/AIDS in Metro Detroit and Southeast Michigan. The organization was founded by 2002 by Rick Henning, who received a "Spirit of Detroit Award" from the Detroit City Council in 2007, in part for his work on Higher Ground.

Support activities 
The organization offers many support services to persons living with HIV-AIDS.

Monday night discussion
This is the primary function of the organization.  It opens with a guided meditation, afterward everyone is encouraged to participate in discussion and to assist each other in the resolution of personal challenges. Topics of discussion often include new diagnosis, status disclosure, friends/family/workplace, doctor relationships, medication choices, dating/relationships, economic/insurance conflicts and long term challenges.

Guest speakers
Featured almost monthly they coincide with a member potluck dinner. Previous speaker topics focused on the spiritual and physical aspect of life with HIV/AIDS and covering topics such as:
 Accupunture
 Buddhist meditation by The Muddy Water Zen Center
 Financial planning by Advisor Reid Beyerlein
 Kabbalah
 Nutrition by Holistic Practitioner Stefan Brink
 Legal issues by The Law Office of Kendra S. Kleber

Annual retreat
Occurs each spring or fall, depending on schedules. Previous retreats were held at Kettunen Center in 2006, Double JJ Ranch in 2007, Ronora Lodge in 2008, and Retreat Center in 2009. Members participate in activities with others also living with HIV/AIDS and have previously included:

Annual blanket drive for AIDS
Higher Ground members are encouraged to give back to the community. Blankets are collected during the Holiday season by Higher Ground volunteers. About two dozens agencies have benefited including:
 Children's Hospital of Michigan
 Ruth Ellis Center

Movie night
Periodic selections are based on applications to living with HIV-AIDS. Previous viewing among others have included:
 Deepak Chopra's Body Mind And Soul
 Girl Positive
 Incredible Mrs. Ritchie
 The Secret (2006 film)
 The 24th Day

Hatha yoga
Hatha yoga practice is held on Thursday evenings for persons with HIV-AIDS.

Reiki
Reiki practice is occasionally held in conjunction with the Monday night support meeting.

References
 Between The Lines Newspaper November 13th, 2008
 Pride Source June Banquet 2007 Spirit Of Detroit Award recipients
 CW50 TV News Events
 WDET 101.9 FM Radio Events
 Michigan HIV News October 2008
 Royal Oak Mirror News November 16th, 2008
 City Of Detroit Health Department World AIDS Day Event Press Release November 25th, 2008
 Soho Bar Fund Raiser Event Metro Times 2008
 Detroit Free Press December 7th, 2008
 93.9 FM The River Detroit Radio  2007 Blanket Drive support
 World AIDS Day Campaign 2006
 Oakland County Mental Health Agencies And Organizations
 Red Ribbon Bowl To Throw A Strike For HIV/AIDS, Between The Lines, March 5th, 2009
 FGI gundraiser, Hometown Life News November 12th, 2009

External links
 Higher Ground Website

HIV/AIDS organizations in the United States
Non-profit organizations based in Michigan
Support groups